Soreang is a town and district of Bandung Regency, West Java, Indonesia. Located 18 km from Bandung city, Soreang is the regency seat of Bandung Regency, where the regent's office and local legislature are located at Kopo-Soreang Highway.

Administrative divisions
Soreang is divided into 10 villages which are as follows:

Cingcin
Karamatmulya
Pamekaran
Panyirapan
Parungserab
Sadu
Sekarwangi
Soreang
Sukajadi
Sukanagara

Transportation
Soreang is a transportation hub for the southern parts of the regency. In the colonial times, there used to be a railway connecting Bandung and Ciwidey, but was discontinued in 1982 following a collapse of the track in 1972.

A toll road connecting the city of Bandung and Soreang directly was opened in December 2017, reducing travel time to around 10 minutes from previously up to 2 hours.

Toll Road Access

Climate
Soreang has a tropical rainforest climate (Af) with moderate rainfall from June to September and heavy rainfall from October to May.

See also
Bandung Regency
Soreang-Pasir Koja Toll Road
Jalak Harupat Stadium, located near Soreang

References

Bandung Regency
Populated places in West Java
Regency seats of West Java